Merced station could refer to two stations in Merced, California:
 Merced station (Amtrak)
 Merced station (California High-Speed Rail)

See also 
 Merced metro station, in Mexico City